Charlie Stewart (23 December 1936 – 29 November 1998) was a Scotland international rugby union player. He became the 104th President of the Scottish Rugby Union.

Rugby Union career

Amateur career

Stewart played for Kelso.

Provincial career

He played for South of Scotland District in the 1960–61 Scottish Inter-District Championship.

International career

He played for Scotland twice from 1960 to 1961.

Administrative career

He became the 104th President of the Scottish Rugby Union. He served the standard one year from 1990 to 1991.

References

1936 births
1998 deaths
Scottish rugby union players
Scotland international rugby union players
Presidents of the Scottish Rugby Union
Kelso RFC players
South of Scotland District (rugby union) players
Rugby union players from Scottish Borders
Rugby union flankers